Estadio Jose Rafael "Fello" Meza Ivankovich is a multi-use stadium in Cartago, Costa Rica.  It is currently used mostly for football matches and is the home stadium of C.S. Cartaginés.  The stadium holds 8350 people and was built in 1949.

References

Football venues in Costa Rica
Buildings and structures in Cartago Province
Buildings and structures in Cartago, Costa Rica